Sam Platt (born August 19, 1958, in Jacksonville, Florida) is a former gridiron football player who played with the Ottawa Rough Riders and the Tampa Bay Bandits as a running back. He scored a touchdown on a 14 yard run in the 1981 Grey Cup, giving Ottawa a 20–0 lead in the first half before Edmonton eventually came back to win the game.

References 

Living people
1958 births
Sportspeople from Jacksonville, Florida
Players of American football from Jacksonville, Florida
American football running backs
Canadian football running backs
Florida State Seminoles football players
Ottawa Rough Riders players
Tampa Bay Bandits players